Eduard Yevgenyevich Malyi (born 24 May 1969) is a former Russian football player and referee.

Referee career
Assistant referee
Russian Third League: 1996–1997
Russian Second Division: 1997–2001
Russian First Division: 1997–2000
Russian Top Division: 2000–2001

Referee
Russian Third League: 1997
Russian Second Division: 1998–2011
Russian Football National League: 2000–2012
Russian Football Premier League: 2005–2012

References

1969 births
Sportspeople from Volgograd
Living people
Soviet footballers
Russian footballers
FC Rotor Volgograd players
Russian Premier League players
Russian football referees
Association football goalkeepers
FC Avangard Kursk players